Kyle Johnson (born 31 December 1988) is a Canadian-born British basketball player. Born in Scarborough, Ontario, Johnson played for West Hill Collegiate Institute before enrolling to LIU Brooklyn to play college basketball. After graduating from college, he has played professionally in Europe and Canada.

College career
Coming from West Hill Collegiate Institute in Toronto, Johnson's college career spanned four seasons, where he averaged 11.6 points per game whilst making a Long Island University record 124 appearances. As a freshman, he was named in the NEC all-rookie team. During his senior year Johnson helped the Blackbirds to a 27–6 record, Win the 2011 Northeast Conference men's basketball tournament and an appearance in the 2011 NCAA Men's Division I Basketball Tournament. He ranks 11th all-time at the school in scoring (1,433) and is second in both three-pointers made (240) and attempted (666).

Professional career
In September 2011 he signed a contract with Ilysiakos in Greece, but in November 2011 he moved to Cypriot club APOEL. He then played one season with Sutor Montegranaro. In November 2013, he signed with Basket Ferentino. He was waived on 18 December 2013.
On 23 December 2013 he signed with Vanoli Cremona. On 25 March 2015, he signed with Pallacanestro Biella of the Serie A2 Basket. In December 2015 he joined Pallacanestro Cantù of the Lega Basket, but he left the team in February 2016 to join Junior Casale.

On 29 December 2016, Johnson signed with London Lightning of the National Basketball League of Canada. On 5 February 2017, he set the points and field goals made record for the London Lightning, as he scored 51 points on 17-of-21 field goals to help his team win 146–102 against the Moncton Miracles.

In July 2019, Johnson signed with Stjarnan of the Úrvalsdeild karla. Stjarnan opened the 2019–20 season with a 89–77 win against reigning champions KR in the annual Icelandic Super Cup behind Johnson's 21 points. On 15 February 2020, Johnson scored 14 points in Stjarnan's 75–89 win against Grindavík in the Icelandic Cup.

In February 2020, Kyle Johnson signed to play for the Fraser Valley Bandits of the Canadian Elite Basketball League. For the season he averaged 5.0 points and 3.0 rebounds in 7 games.

In January 2021, Johnson returned to Iceland and signed with Úrvalsdeild club Njarðvík. For the season, he averaged 15.1 points and 7.4 rebounds per game.

On 11 May 2021, Johnson signed with the Ottawa Blackjacks of the Canadian Elite Basketball League. After appearing in 4 games for the Blackjacks, Johnson signed with the Hamilton Honey Badgers in July. He appeared in 6 games with the Honey Badgers, averaging 8.3 points and 2.7 rebounds per game.

In January 2022, Johnson signed with reigning Icelandic champions Þór Þorlákshöfn. In 8 regular season games, he averaged 12.0 points and 5.9 rebounds per game. He averaged 13.7 points in seven playoff games, scoring a season high 29 points in a victory against Grindavík in the first round. In the second round, Þór was swept by eventual champions Valur. In May, he returned to the Hamilton Honey Badgers.

National team career
Johnson has been a part of the Great Britain national basketball team since 2011. He has played in many competitions for the team, most notably the London 2012 Olympics and the 2011 Eurobasket, 2013 Eurobasket, 2017 Eurobasket Championships.

References

External links
Profile at realgm.com
Icelandic statistics at Icelandic Basketball Association

1988 births
Living people
A.S. Junior Pallacanestro Casale players
APOEL B.C. players
Basket Ferentino players
Basketball players from Toronto
Basketball players at the 2012 Summer Olympics
Brampton A's players
British men's basketball players
Canadian expatriate basketball people in Greece
Canadian expatriate basketball people in Iceland
Canadian expatriate basketball people in Italy
Canadian men's basketball players
Ilysiakos B.C. players
Lega Basket Serie A players
LIU Brooklyn Blackbirds men's basketball players
London Lightning players
Njarðvík men's basketball players
Olympic basketball players of Great Britain
Pallacanestro Biella players
Pallacanestro Cantù players
Shooting guards
Sportspeople from Scarborough, Toronto
Stjarnan men's basketball players
Sutor Basket Montegranaro players
Úrvalsdeild karla (basketball) players
Vanoli Cremona players